"Two Solitudes" refers to a perceived lack of communication and lack of will to communicate between Anglophone and Francophone people in Canada. The term was popularized by Hugh MacLennan's novel Two Solitudes.

In politics
In her 2005 investiture speech as Governor-General of Canada, Michaëlle Jean stated that "the time of 'two solitudes' had finished".

References

External links

 McGill-Queens University Press - Quebec's McGill University, with Queen's University, Press description of the novel "Two Solitudes"

Canadian identity
Political terminology in Canada